Water polo at the 2019 World Aquatics Championships was held between 14 and 27 July 2019.

Schedule
Two competitions were held.

All time are local (UTC+9).

Medal summary

Medal table

Medal events

References

External links
Official website
Records and statistics (reports by Omega)

 
Water polo
2019
2019
World Aquatics Championships